When I Turned Nine (lit. "Life at Age Nine") is a 2004 South Korean drama film.

Synopsis 
The film focuses on Baek Yeo-min (Kim Seok), a thoughtful and mature nine-year-old boy living in 1970s Korea. Trying to help his one-eyed mother after noticing a pair of expensive glasses in a store, Yeo-min decides to make his own money by getting a job as an ice-cream boy, selling ice cream and doing chores until his mother notices the money he made and punishes Yeo-min, saying that he shouldn't have made money from his summer jobs.

During a school punishment, he meets a haughty new girl named Jang Woo-rim (Lee Se-young). At first they both don't like each other, but they soon become best friends. For many months they happily spend time together, but their relationship ends when she has to move back to Seoul to live with her father. The night before she leaves, Yeo-min gives her a surprise kiss on the cheek and runs away. Woo-rim later tells a surprised Yeo-rim that she is actually in love with him, and she leaves him a present: a pair of glasses for his mother. Walking away with his friends in the snow at the end of the movie, he looks back at her with a glum expression on his face.

Cast
 Kim Seok as Baek Yeo-min
 Lee Se-young as Jang Woo-rim
 Na Ah-hyun as Oh Geum-bok
 Kim Myung-jae as Shin Ki-jong
 Jung Sun-kyung as Yeo-min's mother
 Ahn Nae-sang as Tam-im
 Ji Dae-han as Yeo-min's father
 Seo Jin-won as Park Pal-bong 
 Shin Jung-geun as Black Swallow's father
 Jung Ae-yeon as Kim Yoon-hee
 Noh Hyeon-jeong  as Black Swallow's mother
 Go Seo-hee as Shin Ki-soon
 Choi Deok-moon as Park Pal-bong

Reception
Upon its release, the film attracted 352,182 viewers.

It also won Best Film, Best Director, Best Screenplay, and Best Child Actor/Actress at the 12th Chunsa Film Art Awards in 2004.

References

External links
 
 

2004 films
2000s Korean-language films
South Korean drama films
2004 drama films
2000s South Korean films